Kisbey is a village in the Canadian province of Saskatchewan within the Rural Municipality of Brock No. 64 and Census Division No. 1. The village took its name from Richard Claude Kisbey (d. 1941), an Irish immigrant who settled in Estevan.

History 
Kisbey incorporated as a village on May 8, 1907.

Demographics 

Sports
The Arcola/Kisbey Combines of the senior men's Big 6 Hockey League play at the local ice rink.

See also
 List of communities in Saskatchewan
 Villages of Saskatchewan

References

External links

Villages in Saskatchewan
Division No. 1, Saskatchewan